JHD may refer to:

 Jon-Henri Damski
 Journal of Huntington's Disease
 John Herbert Dillinger